William Tayleur (10 September 1803 – 5 November 1873) was an English  Liberal politician who sat in the House of Commons from 1832 to 1835.

Tayleur was the son of John Tayleur of Buntingsdale and his wife Penelope Pearson, daughter of Thomas Pearson of Tottenhall, Staffordshire. He was Deputy Lieutenant of Shropshire and was High Sheriff of Shropshire  in 1827.

At the 1832 general election Tayleur was elected Member of Parliament for Bridgwater. He held the seat until 1835.

Tayleur died at the age of 70.

References

External links
 

1803 births
1873 deaths
High Sheriffs of Shropshire
Deputy Lieutenants of Shropshire
Liberal Party (UK) MPs for English constituencies
UK MPs 1832–1835